Xanthodactylon is a genus of lichenized fungi in the family Teloschistaceae.

References

External links
Index Fungorum

Teloschistales
Lichen genera
Teloschistales genera